420 may refer to:
420 (number)
420 (cannabis culture), informal reference to cannabis use and celebrations on April 20
California Senate Bill 420 or the Medical Marijuana Program Act
"420" (Family Guy), an episode of Family Guy
"4-2-0" (song), a song by Kottonmouth Kings from Rollin' Stoned
AD 420, a year in the 5th century of the Julian calendar
420 BC, a year
April 20
420 (dinghy), a class of double-handed racing sailboats
420 Bertholda, a main-belt asteroid
4-2-0, a classification of steam locomotives
"4:20", a song by Six Feet Under on the 1997 album Warpath
Section 420 of the Indian Penal Code, a law against cheating and dishonesty
 +420, calling code of Czech Republic

See also
420th (disambiguation)
List of highways numbered 420